Aleksey Vladimirovich Ostrovskiy (also transliterated Alexei Vladimirovich Ostrovsky; born January 14, 1976) is a member of the State Duma of Russia and served as the Governor of Smolensk Oblast from 2012 to 2023. He is a member of the LDPR, the State Duma's Committee on International Affairs, and on State Duma's Commission on Credentials and Deputies' Ethics. He holds degrees in law and economics.

References

1976 births
Living people
Politicians from Moscow
Liberal Democratic Party of Russia politicians
Fourth convocation members of the State Duma (Russian Federation)
Fifth convocation members of the State Duma (Russian Federation)
Sixth convocation members of the State Duma (Russian Federation)
Governors of Smolensk Oblast